Secondary Highway 528A, commonly referred to as Highway 528A, is a provincially maintained secondary highway in the Canadian province of Ontario. The  spur route links the community of Wolseley Bay in French River with several lodge resorts to the southeast. The route ends suddenly within viewing distance of the French River, where a driveway continues into a lodge.

Route description 
Highway 528A is a short route located on the northern edge of Parry Sound District in central Ontario, which provides access to several private recreational properties that front Wolseley Bay, a large body of water attached to Lake Nipissing to the northeast and forms the delta of the Wolseley River. It passes through dense forest for the majority of its entire length, though grasslands appear briefly near the midpoint of the route. Though the route is located in the Canadian Shield, there are no rock outcroppings visible along its length. The highway ends at a cul-de-sac where a private driveway continues to a lodge.

History 
Highway 528A was first assumed by the Department of Highways in 1957,
and was likely provincially maintained as a development road prior to that.
Since then, the route has remained unchanged.

Major intersections 
The following table lists the major junctions along Highway 528A. The entirety of the route is located within Sudbury District.
{| class="wikitable" style="width:650px;"
|-
!scope="col"|Location
!scope="col"|km
!scope="col"|Destinations
!scope="col"|Notes
|-
|rowspan="2"|French River
|0.0
|
|
|-
|5.1
|
|Dead end; private access to Pine Cove Lodge

References 

528A